Trenerth is a hamlet in the parish of Gwinear-Gwithian, Cornwall, England, United Kingdom.

References

Hamlets in Cornwall